Reza Khan may refer to:

Reza-Qoli Khan Hedayat (1800–1871), Persian writer and poet
Ahmed Raza Khan Barelvi (1856–1921), Pashtun scholar
Reza Shah (1878–1944), Shah of the Imperial State of Iran from 1925 to 1941
Reza Khan (Afghan) (d. 2007), Afghan who was executed in 2007
Reza Khan, Iran, a village in Lorestan Province, Iran
Mohammad Ali Reza Khan (born 1947), Bangladeshi ornithologist